Chrysocyma is a genus of moths in the subfamily Lymantriinae. The genus was erected by George Hampson in 1905.

Species
Chrysocyma deleta (Hering, 1926) Tanzania
Chrysocyma fulvicolora (Hampson, 1910) Congo, Zimbabwe
Chrysocyma jordani (Hering, 1926) Angola
Chrysocyma mesopotamia Hampson, 1905 Tanzania, Zimbabwe
Chrysocyma ochricoloria (Strand, 1911) Tanzania

References

Lymantriinae